The Preservation Islets are a close group of small granite islands, with a combined area of 0.93 ha, just north-west of Preservation Island in south-eastern Australia. They are part of Tasmania’s Preservation Island Group, lying in eastern Bass Strait south-west of Cape Barren Island in the Furneaux Group.

Fauna
Recorded breeding seabird and wader species include little penguin, Pacific gull and sooty oystercatcher.

Other islands in the Preservation Group with breeding seabirds include:
 Night Island
 Preservation Island
 Rum Island

References

Furneaux Group